A week with the President was a Czech Journalist television program broadcast by TV Barrandov. The first episode was broadcast on 16 March 2017. It was presented by Petr Kolář and Alex Mynářová, as they interviewed Czech president Miloš Zeman, who commented on current events. It quickly became one of the most viewed journalistic programs in the Czech Republic. The program was considered part of Zeman's re-election campaign for the 2018 presidential election. It was discontinued in January 2020.

References

External links
Website

2018 Czech presidential election
2017 Czech television series debuts
Czech television shows
TV Barrandov original programming
Czech television talk shows
Miloš Zeman